Ernodea is a genus of flowering plants in the family Rubiaceae. All species are small shrubs endemic to the Caribbean region, with most species restricted to the Bahamian Archipelago.

Species
 Ernodea angusta Small - Florida, The Bahamas
 Ernodea cokeri Britton ex Coker - Florida, The Bahamas
 Ernodea gigantea Correll - The Bahamas
 Ernodea littoralis Sw. - Florida, Mexico, Belize, The Bahamas, Cayman Islands, Cuba, Dominican Republic, Haiti, Jamaica, Leeward Islands, Netherlands Antilles, Puerto Rico, Turks and Caicos Islands, Windward Islands, Colombia
 Ernodea millspaughii Britton - The Bahamas, Turks and Caicos Islands
 Ernodea nashii Britton - The Bahamas
 Ernodea serratifolia Correll - The Bahamas, Turks and Caicos Islands
 Ernodea taylori Britton - The Bahamas, Cayman Islands, Cuba, Haiti

References

 
Rubiaceae genera
Taxa named by Olof Swartz